is a Japanese professional shogi player ranked 6-dan.

Early life and education
Tōyama was born on December 10, 1979, in Nerima, Japan. He entered the Japan Shogi Association's apprentice school at the rank of 6-kyū under the tutelage of shogi professional  in 2005.

Tōyama was promoted to the rank of 1-dan in August 1997 and obtained full professional status and the rank of 4-dan after finishing tied for first with Issei Takazaki in the 37th 3-dan league (April 2005September 2005) with a record of 13 wins and 5 losses.

Tōyama is a graduate of Seikei University. He was a member of the school's tennis team.

Promotion history
Tōyama's promotion history is as follows:
 6-kyū: 1993
 1-dan: 1997
 4-dan: October 1, 2005
 5-dan: February 22, 2011
 6-dan: February 23, 2018

References

External links
ShogiHub: Professional Player Info · Toyama, Yusuke
blog: 将棋棋士: 遠山雄亮のファニースペース
older blog: chama258.seesaa.net

Japanese shogi players
Living people
Professional shogi players
Seikei University alumni
Professional shogi players from Tokyo
1979 births
People from Nerima